The Tillamook River is a stream, about  long, near the coast of northwest Oregon in the United States. It drains an oceanside valley in the foothills of the Northern Oregon Coast Range west of Portland and empties into the Pacific Ocean via Tillamook Bay. It is one of five rivers—the Tillamook, the Trask, the Wilson, the Kilchis, and the Miami—that flow into the bay.

For its lower , it shares a channel with the Trask River.

Home of the Tillamook County Creamery Association, the county has been called "a natural cow pasture" by ''Sunset Magazine".

Tributaries
Named tributaries from source to mouth are Mills, Munson, Joe, Simmons, Fawcett, Killam, and Bewley creeks. Then come Sutton, Beaver, Anderson, Fagan, Esther, Tomlinson, Memaloose, and Dick creeks.

See also
List of rivers of Oregon

References

External links
Tillamook Estuaries Partnership

Rivers of Oregon
Rivers of Tillamook County, Oregon